The chestnut-bellied thrush (Turdus fulviventris) is a species of bird in the family Turdidae. It is found in Colombia, Ecuador, Peru, and Venezuela. Its natural habitats are subtropical or tropical moist montane forests and heavily degraded former forest.

Description
The adult male has a black head, a black throat with some white streaking, a dark grey back and dusky wings and tail. The upper breast is pale grey and the lower breast and belly are rufous. The beak is yellow, the narrow eye ring is orange and the legs are dull yellow. The female is similar in appearance but rather duller. It is the only thrush in the genus Turdus with a rufous belly to be found in the northern Andes. The song is not often uttered, but consists of a series of disjointed phrases with some buzzes and short trills in between.

Distribution and habitat
The chestnut-bellied thrush is native to northwestern South America. Its range includes western Venezuela, western Colombia, Ecuador, northern Peru and northwestern Bolivia.

Ecology
This thrush often occurs singly and may also be seen in pairs, but does not usually join mixed flocks. Males may sing from high in the canopy, and both sexes often forage among the twigs and branches. It sometimes descends to ground level, particularly besides roads and trails, and turns over the leaf litter, searching for invertebrates, and may remain in one area for some time.

Status
The chestnut-bellied thrush is described as an uncommon species and the population is thought to be declining slowly as the bird's woodland habitat is degraded. However, it has a very large range and presumably a large total population, and the International Union for Conservation of Nature has assessed its conservation status as being of "least concern".

References

chestnut-bellied thrush
Birds of the Colombian Andes
Birds of the Ecuadorian Andes
Birds of the Venezuelan Andes
chestnut-bellied thrush
chestnut-bellied thrush
Taxonomy articles created by Polbot